Grandes Éxitos a la Manera de Alejandro Fernández (English: Greatest Hits in the Way of Alejandro Fernández) is the third album recorded by Mexican singer Alejandro Fernández and was produced by Pedro Ramírez. In this album, Fernández interprets classic songs of great composers like Luis Demetrio and Armando Manzanero. He shot a video for the song "A Pesar De Todo". Other songs known from this album is "Si Dios Me Quita La Vida".  Despite the title, this is not a greatest hits compilation.

Track listing
 "La Gloria Eres Tú"  – 2:57
 "Consentida"  – 4:01
 "Encadenados"  – 2:54
 "Si Dios Me Quita La Vida"  – 4:33
 "Conozco A Los Dos"  – 3:03
 "Rival"  – 3:42
 "No"  – 3:15
 "A Pesar De Todo"  – 3:19
 "Noche De Ronda"  – 4:01
 "La Enramada"  – 2:55
 "El Día Que Me Quieras"  – 4:18
 "Piensa En Mí"  – 4:25
 "Mitad Tú, Mitad Yo"  – 2:44
 "Voy"  – 2:47

Chart performance

Album

Singles

References

1994 albums
Alejandro Fernández albums
Covers albums
Columbia Records albums